Prasophyllum patens, commonly known as the broad-lipped leek orchid or sandstone leek orchid, is a species of orchid endemic to the Sydney region of New South Wales. It has a single tubular green leaf and up to thirty green to greenish-brown, lemon-scented flowers with a white labellum.

Description
The edges of the labellum are folded and crinkled and there is a pale green callus in its centre but ending just after the bend. Flowering occurs between September and October.<ref name="RBGS">{{cite web|last1=Bernhardt|first1=Peter|last2=Rowe|first2=Ross R.|title=Prasophyllum patens|url=http://plantnet.rbgsyd.nsw.gov.au/cgi-bin/NSWfl.pl?page=nswfl&lvl=sp&name=Prasophyllum~patens|publisher=Royal Botanic Garden Sydney|accessdate=11 December 2017}}</ref>

Taxonomy and namingPrasophyllum patens was first formally described in 1810 by Robert Brown and the description was published in Prodromus Florae Novae Hollandiae et Insulae Van Diemen. The specific epithet (patens) is a Latin word meaning "lying open".

Distribution and habitat
The broad-lipped leek orchid grows in heath and heathy forest mostly in the Sydney region. Some sources include Queensland Victoria, Tasmania and South Australia in the range of this orchid while the Herbarium of the Royal Botanic Gardens Victoria suggests "the relationship between P. odoratum sens. strict. and P. patens, P. robustum, P. truncatum and P. album'' is (also) in need of study".

References

External links 
 
 

patens
Flora of New South Wales
Endemic orchids of Australia
Plants described in 1810